Brian Ackland-Snow (31 March 1940 – 30 March 2013) was an English production designer. He won an Oscar in the category Best Art Direction for the film A Room with a View. He also won an Emmy for best art direction for a miniseries or special in 1995 for Scarlett on CBS.

His son, Andrew Ackland-Snow, has also gone on to become an art director in films.

Selected filmography
 A Room with a View (1985)

References

External links

1940 births
2013 deaths
British production designers
British film designers
Best Art Direction Academy Award winners
Best Production Design BAFTA Award winners
Primetime Emmy Award winners